The Future of Emily is a 1984 West German drama film directed by Helma Sanders-Brahms. Barbara Kosta, author of Recasting Autobiography: Women's Counterfictions in Contemporary German Literature and Film, states that The Future of Emily, along with Laputa, "pursue[s] traditional narrative patterns" compared to Germany, Pale Mother, and "lapse[s] further into awkward melodrama." Christian Schröder, author of Hildegard Knef: Mir sollten sämtliche Wunder begegnen, wrote that the film appears "very French" and "very German" at the same time and compared it to the films of Éric Rohmer.

Plot
Isabelle Kahn is a successful film actress whose young daughter, Emily, is frequently cared for by her parents in Normandy while she's away working. After a production ends in Berlin, she returns to visit her daughter. However, the rejoicing is short-lived. Her smitten costar follows, and his presence sets off an intense clash between the self-centered thespian and her mother.

Development
Filming began in Barfleur and Réville in Manche, Normandy in January 1984.

Cast
Brigitte Fossey as Isabelle Kahn (Voice: Helma Sanders-Brahms)
Camille Raymond as Emily Kahn (Voice: Caroline Ruprecht)
Hermann Treusch as Friedrich (Voice: Mathieu Carrière)
Hildegard Knef as Paula Kahn
Ivan Desny as Charles Kahn

Release
The film was released on DVD by Facets Multi-Media in 2008.

Reception
Film critic Glenn Erickson described the film as "good" and praised Facets' DVD production, London's Time Out wrote that the "actresses sink their teeth into" the film "with consummate relish" and it has been noted that the film is considered an "excellent drama [which is] Sanders-Brahms' most refined and elegant." It has been argued that the film's "point is that, in modern society, there are women who also are living well without men, but they are brainwashed into thinking that they would be better off with male partners."

References

Bibliography
Schröder, Christian. Hildegard Knef: Mir sollten sämtliche Wunder begegnen. Aufbau-Verlag, 2004. , 9783351025755.

External links

The Future of Emily at the TCM Movie Database
Flügel und Fesseln at Film Portal 

1980s avant-garde and experimental films
1984 drama films
1984 films
Films about actors
Films directed by Helma Sanders-Brahms
Films produced by Barbet Schroeder
Films set in Berlin
Films set in France
Films shot in Berlin
Films shot in France
German avant-garde and experimental films
German drama films
1980s German-language films
West German films
Films scored by Jürgen Knieper
1980s German films